Semeniškiai is a village in Vilnius County, Lithuania. According to the 2011 census, the village has a population of 5 people.

References

Villages in Vilnius County